Yusuf Rabiev (born 25 May 1979) is a former Tajik International professional footballer, and current Istiklol Youth Team coach.

Career

International
Rabiev won the 2006 AFC Challenge Cup with the Tajik national team, scoring four goals in the tournament including a brace against Kyrgyzstan in the semi-final. Earlier he had played at the 2006 World Cup qualifiers, however Tajikistan failed to get behind the first stage. During the Qualification for the AFC Challenge Cup 2008 he helped Tajikistan to edge Philippines and qualify for the final tournament, where he scored a hat-trick against Afghanistan as his team won 4–0.

Career statistics

International

Statistics accurate as of match played 19 March 2013

International goals
Scores and results list Tajikistan's goal tally first.

Honours

Club
Varzob Dushanbe
Tajik League (3): 1998, 1999, 2000
Tajik Cup (3): 1998, 1999
Regar-TadAZ
Tajik League (1): 2001
Tajik Cup (1): 2001
Parvoz Bobojon Ghafurov
Tajik Cup (2): 2004, 2007
Khujand
Tajik Cup (1): 2008
Istiklol
Tajik League (2): 2010, 2011
Tajik Cup (2): 2009, 2010
Tajik Supercup (1): 2010
AFC President's Cup (1): 2012

International
Tajikistan
AFC Challenge Cup (1): 2006

Personal
Top Goal Scorer: Tajik League 2010

References

External links

 

Living people
Tajikistan international footballers
Tajikistani footballers
1976 births
Sportspeople from Dushanbe
Association football forwards
Tajikistan Higher League players